Haynes Inlet (or Haynes Slough) is a bay located in North Bend, Coos County.

It is crossed by the Haynes Inlet Bridge, part of the U.S. Route 101.

See also 
 Coos Bay

References 

 
 

Bays of Oregon
Bodies of water of Coos County, Oregon